Khvajehi may refer to:
 Khvajehi, Fars
 Khvajehi, Kerman
 Khvajehi, South Khorasan

See also
 Khvajeh (disambiguation)